{{DISPLAYTITLE:C13H12O2}}
The molecular formula C13H12O2 (molar mass: 200.23 g/mol) may refer to:

 Bisphenol F, a small aromatic organic compound
 Monobenzone, an organic chemical in the phenol family

Molecular formulas